is a television drama series produced by  and broadcast on TV Asahi.

Plot

With its flashy, over-the-top explosion scenes, and car stunts, this series gained a reputation as a macho drama. It is representative of the police & detective dramas of the 1980s.

Series
Seibu Keisatsu (10/14/1979 – 4/18/1982)
Seibu Keisatsu Part II (5/30/1982 – 3/20/1983)
Seibu Keisatsu Part III (4/3/1983 – 10/22/1984)
Seibu Keisatsu Special (10/31/2004)

Cast

 Tetsuya Watari : Keisuke Daimon
 Akiji Kobayashi : Chotaro Minami
 Akira Terao : Takeshi Matsuda(Riki)
 Hiroshi Tachi :  Soutaro Tatsumi(Tatsu) / Eiji Hatomura(Hato)
 Tomokazu Miura : Goro Okita
 Yoshizumi Ishihara : Jun Godai
Toshio Shiba : Shinnosuke Yamagata
Shunsuke Kariya : Koji Genda
Shōbun Inoue : Gentarō Hama (Part2 ep.1-35)
Eiken Shōji : Takeshi Ninomiya
Jūkei Fujioka : Daisaku Tani
Ryuta Mine : Ippei Hirao
 Yuko Kotegawa : Akiko Daimon
 Yujiro Ishihara : Chief Kenzo Kogure

Statistics
During the 5-year course of the show, a total of 236 episodes were filmed, with roughly 4,680 vehicles of all types being destroyed during the course of filming, 4.8 tons of explosives being used as well as close to 320 buildings destroyed. Surprisingly, no deaths were recorded, though there were six injured staff and crew members. The average viewer rating was at 14.5% in the Kanto Area.

Vehicles

Daimon Force 
Nissan provided a wide variety of vehicles for the show, most notably for use as police vehicles as well as villain vehicles. The majority of the patrol cars in the show are a mix of Nissan Laurel, Gloria, Cedric as well as Skyline sedans. For vehicle wrecking scenes the 230 and 330 model Cedrics, Glorias and Laurels were mainly used; as the filming staff had strict orders not to damage any of the 430 model Cedric marked patrol cars.

The series also had several notable cars used by the main heroes, including RS Machines 1 to 3, all of which were based on the Nissan Skyline DR30 Turbo RS; as well as Machine-X, a modified Nissan Skyline 2000 TURBO GT-E (HGC211) used primarily by Chief Daimon. There was also Super-Z: a modified Nissan 280ZX 2+2 with gull-wing doors, turbocharger, nitrous, computers, and also quad 20mm guns mounted on the hood. More noteworthy vehicles include a 1980 Nissan Safari which was also heavily modified with a radar camera, computer and also a water cannon with a water pressure so high it was shown to be able to flip a car; three modified Nissan Skylines, dubbed RS vehicles (all modified for special use by the Daimon Force) and a 1980 Nissan Gazelle convertible, which was Section Chief Kogure's personal vehicle. Being a motorcycle cop from the beginning of the series Eiji Hatomura (played by Hiroshi Tachi) used modified Suzuki motorcycles; in particular a GSX1100 Katana, which was his character's favourite bike in the series.

Almost all of the special vehicles are as of today, preserved by Ishihara Promotion.

 Daimon Force automobiles

 Hatomura's motorcycles

Antagonists 
The series' antagonists used a wide variety of vehicles, some of the most notable including:
a massive armored car, the TU-89 355 Ladybird used in episode 1 and 2 of Part I by a hired right-wing mercenary and his henchmen aiming for a national coup d'etat and revenge against Daimon
an illegally-modified Mercury Cougar used by bank robbers in episode 45 of Part I
a stolen Ford Torino, used in episode 47 of Part I
a hijacked Hiroshima Electric Railway 750 tram in episode 18 of Part II
a Hamana Lake pleasure boat used in episode 11 of Part II by gold smugglers
an Isuzu Elf in episode 26 of Part II
a disguised Nissan Cedric van used by jewel smugglers in Episode 39
a fishing boat used in episode 19 of Part III by weapons smugglers
a fake Super Z used by a rival of Daimon's in episode 14 of Part III
a train carrying the MX-83, a tactical ballistic missile used in episode 23 of Part III with the specific use of destroying a ship carrying exiled African politicians
a tanker truck made by Hino Motors in episode 30 of Part III
a hijacked Nissan Diesel tour bus used in episode 39 of Part III

See also
Daitokai Series (1976–79) similar detective drama on NTV.

References

External links

 Article on Seibu Keisatsu
 Official Site (Remake) 
 

Japanese crime television series
1970s Japanese television series
1980s Japanese television series
1979 Japanese television series debuts
1984 Japanese television series endings
TV Asahi original programming
Japanese detective television drama series
Japanese action television series
Tokyo Metropolitan Police Department in fiction